Carmen figuratum (plural: carmina figurata) is a poem that has a certain shape or pattern formed either by all the words it contains or just by certain ones therein. An example is France Prešeren's "Zdravljica", where the shape of each stanza resembles a wine cup. The term derives from the carmina figurata of Renaissance texts – works in which a sacred image was picked out in red letters against a field of black type so that a holy figure could be seen and meditated on during the process of reading. The carmina figurata also spread in the Carolingian period in order to spread the use and study of Latin.

See also
Altar poem
Concrete poetry

References 

Graphic poetry